The National Anti-Corruption Commission (Nazaha) is a Saudi governmental anti-corruption agency. The main objective of Nazaha is to promote integrity and transparency and fight all forms of corruption in the administrative and financial domains. Since 2015, Nazaha is chaired by Dr. Khaled bin Abdulmohsen Al-Muhaisen.

In 2018, Nazaha launched a smartphone application that allows users to file corruption cases. In 2018 alone, Nazaha got 15,591 corruption reports while it received 10,402 reports in 2017.

References

Government agencies of Saudi Arabia
Corruption in Saudi Arabia